AEM Morphou (Athlitiki Enosi Morphou; "Athletic Union Morphou") was a Cypriot football club based in Morphou. Founded in 1960, was playing sometimes in Second and sometimes in the Third and Fourth Division.

After the Turkish invasion of Cyprus and occupation of the city of Morphou in 1974, the team was displaced to the southern part of the island, in Limassol. The football team dissolved in 1991 due to financial problems.

References

Association football clubs disestablished in 1991
Defunct football clubs in Cyprus
Association football clubs established in 1960
1960 establishments in Cyprus
1991 disestablishments in Cyprus